Poem of the River is the seventh album by English alternative rock band Felt, released in 1987.

Track listing
All songs written by Lawrence.

Personnel
Felt
Lawrence – vocals, electric guitar (track 5)
Martin Duffy – Hammond organ
Marco Thomas – bass guitar, electric guitar (track 2)
Gary Ainge – drums
Additional personnel
Tony Willé – electric guitar (tracks 3-5), acoustic guitar (track 6)
Neil Scott – electric guitar (tracks 3-6)
Mayo Thompson – production

References 

Felt (band) albums
1987 albums
Creation Records albums
Albums produced by Mayo Thompson